The UNAF U-20 Women's Tournament is a football (soccer) women's tournament held between nations for under 20 who are members of the UNAF association, however some other teams which are not members are invited. The first edition was held in 2019 in Morocco.

Results

Successful national teams

* hosts.

Comprehensive team results by tournament
For each tournament, the number of teams (in brackets) are shown.

Legend

References

External links 
 unaf official website

 
UNAF competitions